Equity is an unincorporated community in Washington County, in the U.S. state of Ohio.

History
A post office called Equity was established in 1888, and remained in operation until 1902. Howell S. Devol served as postmaster. The Duvol family were prominent pioneers who also founded nearby Devola.

References

Unincorporated communities in Washington County, Ohio
Unincorporated communities in Ohio